Peddavoora is a village in Nalgonda district of the Indian state of Telangana. It is located in Peddavoora mandal of Devarakonda division.

References

Mandal headquarters in Nalgonda district
Villages in Nalgonda district